is a slice of life comedy manga series by Iou Kuroda. Serialized in Kodansha's Monthly Afternoon manga magazine, the series spanned a total of 24 chapters and three tankōbon volumes, the first of which was released in July 2001, the second of which was released in May 2002, and the last of which was released in December 2002. In 2003, a story from the series, Summer in Andalusia, was adapted into an anime film, Nasu: Summer in Andalusia.

Story
Apart from the chapters concerning Takama and Aya, other stories are also featured, such as one telling the chronicles of samurai in the Edo period hunting forbidden eggplant (nasu), another set atop a futuristic Mount Fuji, another tale concerning a truck driver, and also "Summer in Andalusia", the story concerning the professional Spanish bicyclist Pepe Benengeli, from which the film was adapted.

Adaptations
In 2003, Nasu was brought to the attention of animator and director Kitarō Kōsaka by Kōsaka's long-time collaborator from Studio Ghibli, Hayao Miyazaki, a fan of cycling himself. He adapted the Summer in Andalusia story from the manga into the film, Nasu: Summer in Andalusia, which soon went on to become the first Japanese anime film ever to be selected for the Cannes Film Festival. A sequel, Nasu: A Migratory Bird with Suitcase, was also later produced, which won the best Original Video Animation award at the seventh annual Tokyo Anime Awards, held at the 2008 Tokyo International Anime Fair.

References

External links
 Official manga website (Archived)
 

2000 manga
Kodansha manga
Seinen manga